Pyrausta or pyrallis (πυραλλίς) (also called in Greek pyrigonos) is a mythological insect from Cyprus. It is a four-legged insect with filmy wings. It lived in the fire like a salamander and died if it went away from the fire.
Janssens identifies it with the Melanophila acuminata.

See also
Salamanders in folklore
Dragons in Greek mythology

References
 The Natural History of Pliny the Elder, Book 11, Chapter 42 ; the Latin text reads pyral(l)is and either pyrausta or pyrotocon.
 Aelian, On the nature of animals 2, 2 : pyrigonos.
 Em. Janssens, "Le « pyrotocon » de Pline l'Ancien", Latomus, 9, fasc. 3 (juillet-septembre 1950), pp. 283-286 (Société d'Études Latines de Bruxelles).

Greek dragons
Greek legendary creatures
Mythological insects